The Ministry of Energy, Power division (wizarat-e- tawanai ) is a Pakistan Government's federal and executive level ministry created on 4 August 2017 after merging of the Ministry of Petroleum and Natural Resources with the power division of the Ministry of Water and Power (now renamed Ministry of Water Resources), respectively. The ministry has two divisions - petroleum and power. The Petroleum Division is headed by the Petroleum Secretary and the Power Division is headed by the Power Secretary. It is currently headed by Engr. Khurram Dastagir Khan as of May 2022.

Power
 Alternative Energy Development Board
 Central Power Purchasing Agency (CPPA)
 National Engineering Services Pakistan
 National Transmission & Despatch Company
 National Electric Power Regulatory Authority
 Private Power & Infrastructure Board (PPIB)
 Power Information Technology Company
 Water and Power Development Authority
Pakistan Electric Power Company

See also

 Energy policy of Pakistan
 Petroleum Secretary of Pakistan

References

 

Ministry of Energy (Pakistan)
Energy in Pakistan
2017 establishments in Pakistan
Ministries established in 2017